Le Ber is a Canadian surname. Notable people with the surname include:

 Claude Le Ber (1931–2016), French racing cyclist
 Jacques Le Ber ( 1633–1706), Canadian soldier
 Jeanne Le Ber (1662–1714), famous Canadian recluse
 Pierre Le Ber (1669–1707), Canadian painter